Ronald Graham (1935–2020) was an American mathematician.

Ronald or Ron Graham may also refer to:

Ronald William Graham (1870–1949), British diplomat
Ronald Graham (RAF officer) (1896–1967), RAF Air Vice-Marshal
Ronny Graham (1919–1999), American actor
Ronald Graham (actor) (1911–1950), Scottish actor active in the United States
Ron Graham (actor) (1926–2020), Australian actor
 Ron Graham (author), Canadian author and journalist

See also
Ranald Graham (1941–2010), Scottish writer
Ron Grahame (born 1950), Canadian ice hockey player